Relaxin/insulin-like family peptide receptor 4, also known as RXFP4, is a human G-protein coupled receptor.

Function 

GPR100 is a member of the rhodopsin family of G protein-coupled receptors (GPRs) (Fredriksson et al., 2003).[supplied by OMIM]

See also 
 Relaxin receptor

References

External links

Further reading 

 
 
 
 
 
 
 
 

G protein-coupled receptors